Takahiro Tanaka may refer to:

, Japanese footballer
, Japanese Nordic combined skier